Teodoro Felix Artadi Roco (born 12 April 1989 in Cebu), professionally known as Felix Roco, is a Filipino actor.

Biography
The son of local cinema legend Bembol Roco, 21-year-old Felix Roco made a mark with his internationally acclaimed performance in the Venice Film Festival double-awardee Engkwentro.

Taking the lead role of Richard, a gangster running away from the murderous City Death Squad, Felix Roco shows an undeniable range and versatility that may be called one of his most challenging performances ever done. Because Engkwentro was shot a la one continuous take, Felix Roco styled his performance like a stageplay—memorizing all his lines and deeply internalizing his character. With no room for mistakes, Felix delved into the role—doing his own stunts and narrowly avoiding injuries on set.

In order to prepare for his performance, Felix Roco drew from his own past experiences. A former fraternity member, Felix overcame his "wild" younger days and has now transformed himself into a professional, serious actor. He wants young viewers to follow his example of conquering challenges and chasing dreams.

Personal life 

Roco is a son of actor Bembol Roco and the twin brother of actor Dominic Roco.

His twin brother is among 5 people arrested for marijuana.

Filmography

Television

Film

References

External links

1989 births
Living people
People from Lapu-Lapu City
Male actors from Cebu
Filipino male film actors
Filipino male models
Filipino twins
Participants in Philippine reality television series
Star Magic
ABS-CBN personalities
GMA Network personalities